Jaime Emilso Zelaya García  (born 10 July 1965) is a former Honduran sprinter who competed in the men's 100m competition at the 1992 Summer Olympics. He recorded an 11.02, not enough to qualify for the next round past the heats. His personal best is 11.02, set in 1995. He also ran the 200m, recording a 22.05.

References

1965 births
Living people
Honduran male sprinters
Athletes (track and field) at the 1992 Summer Olympics
Olympic athletes of Honduras